The Renault Captur (pronounced as "capture") is a series of subcompact crossover SUVs manufactured by the French automaker Renault. The production version of the first one, based on the B platform, made its debut at the 2013 Geneva Motor Show and started to be marketed in France during April 2013. The Captur Concept was first shown at the 2011 Geneva Motor Show.

Under the "same skin with different specification" strategy adopted by Renault, the Captur is available in a larger version based on the low-cost B0 platform shared with the Duster. It uses the similar styling with the first-generation Captur but with an extended wheelbase, greater ground clearance and all-wheel-drive drivetrain. Referred internally as the "Captur Global Access", the vehicle has been produced in Russia, Brazil and India.

First generation
There are two different versions of the first generation Captur each built on its own platform. The B platform version, codenamed J87 was produced between 2013 and 2019 and the B0 platform "Global Access" version codenamed HA started production in 2016.

Renault Captur (J87; 2013)

The J87 Captur is based on the fourth generation Clio and rides on the B platform. It incorporates design lines from the homonymous concept, as part of Renault's renovated design strategy developed by Laurens van den Acker. It has various customisation options for the interior and the exterior.

The car suspension is made up of MacPherson struts on front and a twist-beam axle on rear. Brakes are discs on front and drums on rear.

The Captur has some new elements, such as a large drawer-like glovebox that is more easily reachable by the driver, instead of a conventional glove compartment in left hand drive models.

The Captur originally had four trim levels in the UK: Expression, Expression+, Dynamique Media Nav and Dynamique S Media Nav. In December 2013, Renault added a top-of-the-range Signature trim and, in 2015, the Iconic. In 2018, the Captur added the sportier S-edition. As standard, it has parking sensors and voice activation for certain functions. In some versions, it also adds removable seat covers with zippers, a new Renault satellite navigation system with touchscreen, reverse cameras and automated head lamps and windscreen wiper.

Safety
The Captur achieved a five star rating at the 2013 Euro NCAP tests. Between its standard safety equipment, it has three point seat belts, two airbags, cruise control, speed limiter, ESC, ABS and audible and visual seat belt reminder warnings. Renault Captur is also equipped with Hill-Start assist feature.

Facelift
In May 2017, Renault introduced a facelifted Captur with  slightly revised interior and exterior designs, more customisation options and improved equipment.

Engines
The Captur is powered by a range of petrol and diesel engines.

Awards
The Captur won What Car? 2014 “Best Small SUV Less Than £16,000”. It was also named Voiture de l'Année 2013 (2013 Best Car) by the French Association of
Automotive Press.

Renault Samsung QM3

The Renault Samsung QM3 is a badge engineered version of the Captur, launched in South Korea at the Seoul Motor Show in April 2013, shortly after its European counterpart was revealed at the Geneva Motor Show. The QM3 was officially released on 6 December 2013, and the initial 1,000 cars allocated to South Korea sold out within seven minutes.

The QM3's dimensions and wheelbase are identical to the Captur's, while the engine range is limited to a single dCi 90 four cylinder diesel and dual clutch transmission.

The QM3 was manufactured in the Renault Valladolid Factory, in Spain. With 24,560 vehicles registered in 2015, it was South Korea's best-selling imported car.

Awards
The QM3 was voted Best Car at the 2013 Seoul Motor Show, and was chosen 2014 “SUV of the Year” by the newspaper JoongAng Ilbo in March 2014.

Renault Captur/Kaptur "Global Access" (HA; 2016) 

A larger car with a similar styling as the original Captur but with a larger wheelbase and ground clearance is being produced by Renault to capture emerging markets. This model is referred internally by Renault as the "Captur Global Access" (Captur GA). Compared to the B platform-based Captur, the Captur GA is cheaper to build as it is based on the first generation Dacia Duster platform instead of the fourth generation Clio while offering larger cabin space.

Russia / CIS 
The Captur GA was first introduced in Russia and the neighbouring CIS countries in 2016, badged as the Renault Kaptur. Change of the naming was explained by the difficulties of the correct pronunciation of the original "Captur" name in the Russian language. The Renault Kaptur is manufactured by the Renault Russia plant since April 2016. The front wheel drive version of this car is powered by the 1.6-litre engine and has manual gearbox or CVT, while all wheel drive versions have the 2.0-litre engine and manual or a 4-speed automatic gearbox.

Assembly in neighboring Kazakhstan began in 2021 at SaryarkaAvtoProm plant (Kostanay), through a partnership between Renault and the Allur Group.

Brazil 
A localised Brazilian version was introduced in the beginning of 2017, badged as the Renault Captur. The Brazilian version has manual (five-speed), CVT and automatic (four-speed) gearboxes. That same year, the Brazilian Captur was named as Best Design by Americar (automotive press association of Latin America). The Brazilian-made Captur GA is exported throughout Latin America. 
In 2021, Renault made a new version of Captur, changing the interior and the engine of it. The 1.6/2.0 engine was changed to 1.3 TCe engine (170cv), produced with Mercedes-Benz.

Uruguay 
The Brazilian-made Captur GA was marketed in Uruguay since November 2017 as the Grand Captur to differentiate it with the European Captur, which was available in the country since February 2016.

India 
The car is available in the Indian market since 2017, also badged as Captur. Production and pre orders started in September 2017. It was also offered with a 1.5 L K9K diesel engine until April 2020. Advertising videos from Renault India got a negative reception in some forum and media outlets for allegedly "misinform" customers on the car awards by mentioning the ones received by the B platform version.

The Captur GA shares the platform with the Indian market Nissan Kicks (D15), which is a slightly larger version of the Nissan Kicks built on the Nissan B platform. Both are currently built at the same manufacturing plant jointly owned by Renault and Nissan in Chennai, India. The Captur GA was discontinued in India in 2020 due to lacklustre sales, with less than 7,000 units produced in 4 years.

Facelift 
In May 2020, Renault Russia launched the facelifted Kaptur. Apart from several subtle exterior and interior updates, the car is now engineered above the B0+ platform instead of the B0 for better ride quality, resulting in more than 55 percent components being updated. The hydraulic power steering was ditched in favour of the modern electric power steering, which in turn allowed the steering column to be adjusted for reach. The Kaptur received a new 1.3 L H5Ht petrol turbo engine, replacing the 2.0 L F4R naturally aspirated petrol engine. In July 2021, the facelifted Captur went on sale in Brazil with the 1.3-litre petrol engine.

Engines
Initially, the B0 model did not have diesel engines. It mounts engines either burning petrol (for Russia-assembled vehicles) or a mix of petrol/ethanol (for Brazil-assembled vehicles). The India-assembled Captur had a diesel engine as an option.

Safety
It has ventilated front disc brakes and rear drum brakes.

Latin NCAP
The car got a 4-star safety rating in the 2017 Latin NCAP tests.

Second generation (JB/JE; 2019) 

The second-generation Captur debuted in July 2019. It is based on the newer CMF-B platform which also underpin the Clio V, the second-generation Nissan Juke and the European-spec Arkana. The second-generation Captur is around  longer than the outgoing model, which is complemented with  longer wheelbase.

At launch, Renault announced a total of 11 exterior colors, 4 contrasting roof colors, and 3 customization packages available for the European market, resulting in 90 possible color schemes.

The base engine is also available out of the factory with a dual-fuel LPG system. The tech features over 150 new patents from Renault.

Top-spec versions is equipped with a 9.3-inch vertically-mounted touchscreen infotainment system, and a 10.2-inch digital instrument cluster screen. Lower trim levels have a 7.0-inch touchscreen and a 7.0-inch instrument display.

It is sold with its international Captur name from the first half of 2020 in South Korea, instead of being rebadged as the Renault Samsung QM3 as with the previous generation.

Mitsubishi ASX
In September 2022, Mitsubishi Motors released the second-generation Mitsubishi ASX for the European market, which is a rebadged Captur. It will be sold in 2023 with five powertrain options from the Captur, ranging from petrol, mild hybrid, full hybrid and plug-in hybrid.

Captur concept

A concept car named Renault Captur was unveiled by Renault at the 2011 Geneva Motor Show. It was shown with the Renault Samsung badge at the 2012 Busan Motor Show.

The Captur is a mini SUV, and it is the second of six concept cars showing Renaults future design directions. The first was the Renault DeZir. It was designed by Julio Lozano under the leadership of Renault's design chief Laurens Van den Acker.

Technical details
It is said to be based on the same platform as its partner Nissan's Juke. The Captur is powered by a twin-turbocharged version of the 1.6 L dCi "Energy" engine which will be rolled out among Renault and Nissan models during 2011.

The car is made from carbon fibre, has butterfly doors and has a removable roof. It weighs  and features large 22 inch wheels. Despite its crossover appearance, the Captur is front-wheel drive and features Renault's new ‘RX2’ mechanical self-locking differential to transfer the available torque to the driven wheel with the most grip.

Sales 
Despite being on the market for less than a full year, it managed to rank third in the European small crossover segment for 2013, with just over 84,000 sales, behind the Nissan Juke and the Dacia Duster, and it was the segment's best seller in the last quarter of 2013.

At the end of 2015, Renault Captur was ranked 14th out of the 20 most sold cars in Europe with 195,323 units.

References

External links

 (UK)
 (Renault Samsung QM3)

Captur
Captur
Cars of Brazil
Cars of China
Front-wheel-drive vehicles
Crossover sport utility vehicles
Mini sport utility vehicles
Cars introduced in 2013
2010s cars
2020s cars
Vehicles with CVT transmission
Euro NCAP small off-road
Latin NCAP small off-road